The brown-backed honeybird (Prodotiscus regulus), also known as Wahlberg's honeybird, Wahlberg's honeyguide and sharp-billed honeyguide, is a species of bird in the family Indicatoridae. This bird is named after the Swedish naturalist Johan August Wahlberg.

Range
It is found in Angola, Botswana, Cameroon, Central African Republic, DRC, Ivory Coast, Eswatini, Ethiopia, Kenya, Lesotho, Liberia, Malawi, Mozambique, Namibia, Nigeria, Rwanda, Somalia, South Africa, Sudan, Tanzania, Togo, Uganda, Zambia, and Zimbabwe.

References

External links
 (Sharp-billed Honeyguide =) Brown-backed Honeyguide - Species text in The Atlas of Southern African Birds.

brown-backed honeybird
brown-backed honeybird
Taxonomy articles created by Polbot